Roland DePaul is an American former ice hockey center who was an All-American for Minnesota in the 1940s.

Career
DePaul was one of a bevy of American players to come from Eveleth in the 1940s, He got his start at Illinois under Vic Heyliger but, half way through his first varsity season, he left the team abruptly. He was rumored to have fallen below the necessary GPA and headed to Akron to continue his career. After World War II he resurfaced in college hockey. Illinois had discontinued its program but DePaul found a landing spot closer to home with Minnesota under the guidance of Larry Armstrong. DePaul played three seasons for the Gophers, leading the team in scoring each campaign. He was named team captain for his senior season and inducted into the Minnesota Athletic Hall of Fame in 2015.

Statistics

Regular season and playoffs

Awards and honors

References

External links
 

American men's ice hockey centers
Date of birth unknown
Ice hockey players from Minnesota
Living people
Illinois Fighting Illini men's ice hockey players
Minnesota Golden Gophers men's ice hockey players
Sportspeople from Eveleth, Minnesota
AHCA Division I men's ice hockey All-Americans
Year of birth missing (living people)